Bliss Blood is an American musician and songwriter. She has written and recorded two albums with virtuoso guitarist Al Street, five albums with New York jazz band The Moonlighters from 2000 to 2009, and six albums from 1988 to 1995 with Houston noise rock band Pain Teens. She has also recorded with the Melvins and many other groups.

Current projects
Bliss Blood is primarily a songwriter who began her career in 1988 in Houston, Texas psychedelic noise rock group Pain Teens, she currently writes songs and plays ukulele in the 1920s and 1930s jazz-themed New York City group The Moonlighters, formed in 1998.  She writes original songs, rare in the "retro jazz" genre, and The Moonlighters released four CDs on their own label, Onliest Records, toured Germany four times, in 2002, 2006, 2007 and 2009, and released their fifth CD, "Enchanted", on WorldSound Records in 2009.  The current lineup of the band includes actress/singer/screenwriter Cindy Ball on vocals and guitar, John Pinella on steel guitar, Rus Wimbish on acoustic bass, Al Street on guitar, and Jim Fryer on horns.

She also collaborates with guitarist Al Street.  In 2015 they released their third cd, 14 unoriginal songs, titled "Unspun" on Bliss' Onliest Records label. They have previously released two CDs, Evanescent (10 original songs) and Live on the Lilac (17 cover tunes).  They had two original songs featured in the independent New York City film Hello Lonesome, directed by Adam Reid, released May 27, 2011.

The Independent Shakespeare Company  headed by actor David Melville performed Bliss Blood's original songs onstage in their August 2012 staging of A Comedy of Errors.

References

External links
Bliss Blood's official webpage and webpage for Bliss Blood & Al Street, The Moonlighters, Delta Dreambox & Pain Teens
Cindy Ball's official webpage Moonlighters guitarist/vocalist
Bliss Blood on Bandcamp complete discography of all releases

American lyricists
American women rock singers
Living people
Pain Teens members
Musicians from Houston
Year of birth missing (living people)
American women singer-songwriters
Singer-songwriters from Texas
Musicians from Omaha, Nebraska
20th-century American singers
20th-century American women singers
21st-century American women singers
Singer-songwriters from Nebraska